Sebeshely is the Hungarian name for two villages in Romania:

 Sebeşel village, Săsciori Commune, Alba County
 Sibişel village, Râu de Mori Commune, Hunedoara County